Åkermanite (Ca2Mg[Si2O7]) is a melilite mineral of the sorosilicate group, containing  calcium, magnesium, silicon, and oxygen. It is a product of contact metamorphism of siliceous limestones and dolomites, and rocks of sanidinite facies. Sanidinite facies represent the highest conditions of temperature of contact metamorphism and are characterized by the absence of hydrous minerals. It has a density of 2.944 g/cm3. Åkermanite ranks a 5 or 6 on the Mohs scale of mineral hardness, and can be found gray, green, brown, or colorless. It has a white streak and a vitreous or resinous luster. It has a tetragonal crystal system and a good, or distinct, cleavage. It is the end member in a solid solution series beginning with gehlenite (Ca2Al[AlSiO7]).

The mineral is named for Anders Richard Åkerman (1837–1922), a Swedish metallurgist. It has been found at Monte Somma and Vesuvius, and Monte Cavalluccio near Rome. It was "grandfathered" in as a species of mineral because it was described prior to 1959, before the founding of the International Mineralogical Association.

References

Sorosilicates
Calcium minerals
Magnesium minerals
Tetragonal minerals
Minerals in space group 113